George Warren "Barney" Schultz (August 15, 1926 – September 6, 2015) was an American professional baseball player and coach. He was a knuckleball-throwing pitcher in the Major Leagues for all or parts of seven seasons between 1955 and 1965 for the St. Louis Cardinals, Detroit Tigers and Chicago Cubs. In October 1966 he was briefly reactivated by the Cardinals so that he could receive a Major League pension.

Schultz was signed by the Philadelphia Phillies in 1944 after playing at Burlington City High School. Throughout much of his career, Schultz lived in Beverly with his wife and children, working in the off season as a carpenter and haberdasher.

Schultz was strictly a relief pitcher, appearing in 227 games without any starts. He was an early specialist in the knuckleball. He had two good years with the Cubs, then was traded to the Cardinals where he had his best season, 1964, with 14 saves (a significant quantity in those days) and a 1.64 earned run average. Probably his most visible moment was in Game 3 of the 1964 World Series, in which he gave up a game-winning home run to Mickey Mantle in the nationally televised Saturday game. However, he had been credited with a save in Game 1, and the Cardinals ultimately won the Series in seven games.

Cardinals' utility catcher Bob Uecker was sometimes called upon to catch when Schultz was brought in to pitch. It was from that experience that Uecker drew some of his material when joking about the difficulties of catching the knuckleball.

In between, Schultz played winter ball in Venezuela for the Gavilanes de Maracaibo club of the Western Professional Baseball League, where he won seven consecutive strikeout titles from 1954 through 1960.

After his playing career ended, Schultz was the Cardinals' roving minor league pitching instructor from 1967 to 1970 and Major League pitching coach from 1971 to 1975. He was a member of the Chicago Cubs' coaching staff in 1977.

Schultz was a resident of Edgewater Park Township, New Jersey, where his home was filled with memorabilia of his baseball career.

Schultz is a member of the South Jersey Baseball Hall of Fame. He died on September 6, 2015, the 50th anniversary of his final MLB game.

See also
 List of St. Louis Cardinals coaches

References

External links

1926 births
2015 deaths
Baseball players from New Jersey
Bradford Blue Wings players
Charleston Senators players
Chicago Cubs coaches
Chicago Cubs players
Chicago Cubs scouts
Columbus Red Birds players
Denver Bears players
Des Moines Bruins players
Detroit Tigers players
Gavilanes de Maracaibo players
Hagerstown Owls players
Hollywood Stars players
Houston Buffaloes players
Houston Buffs players
Jacksonville Suns players
Macon Peaches players
Major League Baseball pitchers
Major League Baseball pitching coaches
Omaha Cardinals players
People from Beverly, New Jersey
People from Edgewater Park, New Jersey
Rock Hill Chiefs players
St. Louis Cardinals coaches
St. Louis Cardinals players
Schenectady Blue Jays players
Sportspeople from the Delaware Valley
Terre Haute Phillies players
Tulsa Oilers (baseball) players
Wilmington Blue Rocks (1940–1952) players